Tuxcacuesco is a town and municipality, in Jalisco in central-western Mexico. The municipality covers an area of 257.46 km². As of 2005, the municipality had a total population of 3,770.

Economy
Tuxcacuesco is home to "Tuxca Corona", a factory started by the Corona family which produces a 100% pure distilled agave liquor.

History
Tuxcacuesco was a separate state prior to the Spanish incursion.  It was conquered by the Spanish in 1523.  During the colonial period it was part of the province of Amula.

Novelist Juan Rulfo was born in the town of Apulco in the northeast part of the municipality in 1917.

References

Municipalities of Jalisco